ICIUM Wonderworld of Ice is a winter entertainment park built in Levi, Finland from ice and snow. The first park opened on 18 December 2010.

Construction 

ICIUM is built by Chinese ice sculptors from Harbin city, where the annual Harbin International Ice and Snow Sculpture Festival has been held since 1963.

Structures in ICIUM 

The main attractions in ICIUM season 2010–2011 were:

Great Wall of China slide.
Helsinki Cathedral.
Helsinki Central railway station.
Pagoda. The green pagoda was the tallest ice sculpture in ICIUM, at over 15 metres high.
Temple of Heaven.
Beijing National Stadium.
Terracotta Army. Ice sculptures of terracotta soldiers.

Chinese folk artists 

Folk artists from Beijing were also in ICIUM to show how to make traditional Chinese folk arts such as straw weaving, snuff bottle painting and dough sculpting.

ICIUM mascot 

Mingming, a baby panda from Bamboo Fairyland, is the mascot of ICIUM. In his first adventure, Mingming tries to save his home from an evil dragon, with the help of Grandpa Reindeer Niila, baby reindeer Nina and Santa Claus.

References

External links
Official ICIUM web site
Virtual Finland 360° panorama picture 
Visit Finland YouTube video

Buildings and structures made of snow or ice
Winter festivals
Outdoor sculptures in Finland
Tourist attractions in Finland
Buildings and structures in Lapland (Finland)
Tourist attractions in Lapland (Finland)